Ahmed Fawzy (born 10 February 1984) is an Egyptian footballer who currently plays for Al-Masry SC in the Egyptian Premier League as a defender.

References

Living people
1984 births
Association football defenders
Egyptian footballers
Egyptian expatriate footballers
Egyptian Premier League players
Al Masry SC players
KFC Turnhout players
Zamalek SC players
Smouha SC players
Egyptian expatriate sportspeople in Belgium
Expatriate footballers in Belgium
People from Suez